Altima may refer to:

 Nissan Altima, a car
 Altima (band), a Japanese musical group
 Altima (Final Fantasy Tactics), the leader of the Lucavi demons in Final Fantasy Tactics
 Altima Ace, a Japanese manga magazine